John Barnard Bush  (born 5 February 1937) is an English farmer and landowner. He was a Justice of the Peace, a High Sheriff of Wiltshire, and finally Lord Lieutenant of Wiltshire from 2004 to 2012.

As non-executive chairman of West Midland Farmers Association Ltd, an agricultural co-operative, he oversaw its conversion into Countrywide Farmers PLC.

Early life
The son of Barnard Robert Swanton Bush, of Norton St Philip, Somerset, and of Elizabeth Bush (née Weeks), Bush was educated at Monkton Combe School and Balliol College, Oxford, graduating BA and MA. and was appointed as a Deputy Lieutenant of the county in 1998. He served as Chairman of the Wiltshire Magistrates' Courts Committee from 2001 to 2005.

In 2004, Bush was appointed as Lord Lieutenant of Wiltshire. He retired in 2012, at the age of seventy-five, to be succeeded by Sarah Rose Troughton, a cousin of the Queen. As Lord Lieutenant, he was also custos rotulorum, and his public duties included overseeing the arrangements for visits to Wiltshire by members of the royal family, representing the Queen at local events, such as presenting awards and medals on her behalf, liaising with the Wiltshire units of the Royal Navy, Army, and Air Force; leading the local magistracy as Chairman of the Lord Chancellor’s Advisory Committee on Justices of the Peace; and advising on nominations for national honours. 

Bush is currently Patron of the Community Foundation for Wiltshire and Swindon, Chairman of Fredericks Wiltshire, and a Trustee of the Devizes Assize Courts Trust. His other interests have included chairing the Wiltshire Historic Buildings Trust and the Wiltshire Bobby Van Trust.

Honours
 1997–1998: High Sheriff of Wiltshire
 1998: Deputy Lieutenant of Wiltshire
 2004: Officer of the Order of the British Empire (for services to the community in Wiltshire)
 10 November 2004: Lord Lieutenant of Wiltshire
 27 July 2005: Knight of the Venerable Order of Saint John
 1 January 2012: Commander of the Royal Victorian Order (2012 New Year Honours list)

Personal life
On 30 December 1961, Bush married Pamela Eve Irene Bagwell, the daughter of Lieutenant-Commander William Bagwell RN of Clonmel, County Tipperary and of Evelyn Irene Hamilton Wills, the only child of Sir Frederick Wills, 1st Baronet. They have two children, Alexander Hugh Barnard Bush (called Alex, born 4 October 1964) and Carolyn Louise Bush (called Carly, and born 18 July 1967). They also have five grandchildren, Morgan, Jasmine, Scarlett, Thomas and Lucy.

Pamela Bush died in 2021.

See also
High Sheriff of Wiltshire
List of Deputy Lieutenants of Wiltshire

References
 

Who's Who 2007 (A. & C. Black, London, 2007)
John Bush at wiltshire.gov.uk (accessed 2 August 2007)
Meet John ... the Queen's new man by David Andrew at thisiswiltshire.co.uk, 20 October 2004 (accessed 2 August 2007)

1937 births
Alumni of Balliol College, Oxford
Commanders of the Order of St John
Commanders of the Royal Victorian Order
Deputy Lieutenants of Wiltshire
English farmers
High Sheriffs of Wiltshire
Living people
Lord-Lieutenants of Wiltshire
Officers of the Order of the British Empire
People educated at Monkton Combe School
People from Marlborough, Wiltshire